Jiang Bo (born in Qiqihar) is a Chinese male pair skater. He skates with partner Li Meiyi.

Programs 
(with Li)

Competitive highlights 
(with Li)

References

External links 

 
 
 

Living people
Chinese male pair skaters
Sportspeople from Qiqihar
1992 births
Figure skaters from Heilongjiang